The Scillitan Martyrs were a company of twelve North African Christians who were executed for their beliefs on 17 July 180 AD. The martyrs take their name from Scilla (or Scillium), a town in Numidia. The Acts of the Scillitan Martyrs are considered to be the earliest documents of the church of Africa and also the earliest specimen of Christian Latin.

It was the last of the persecutions during the reign of Marcus Aurelius, which is best known from the sufferings of the churches of Vienne and Lyon in South Gaul. Marcus Aurelius died on 17 March of the year in question, and persecution ceased sometime after the accession of his son Commodus. A group of sufferers called the Madaurian martyrs seems to belong to the same period; in the correspondence of St Augustine, Namphamo, one of their number, is spoken of as an "archimartyr," which appears to mean a protomartyr of Africa.

The account
The Acts of their martyrdom are of interest, as being among the most ancient Acts extant for the Roman Province of Africa.
 
The martyrs' trial and execution took place in Carthage under the proconsul Publius Vigellius Saturninus, whom Tertullian declares to have been the first persecutor of Christians in Africa. The trial is notable among the trials of early martyrs inasmuch as the accused were not subjected to torture.

The Scillitan sufferers were twelve in all—seven men and five women. Their names were Speratus, Nartzalus, Cintinus (Cittinus), Veturius, Felix, Aquilinus, Laetantius, Januaria, Generosa, Vestia, Donata, and Secunda. Two of these bear Punic names (Nartzalus, Cintinus), but the rest are Latin names. Six had already been tried: of the remainder, to whom these Acta primarily relate, Speratus was the principal spokesman. He claimed for himself and his companions that they had lived a quiet and moral life, paying their dues and doing no wrong to their neighbors. But when called upon to swear by the name of the emperor, he replied "I recognize not the empire of this world; but rather do I serve that God whom no man hath seen, nor with these eyes can see." The response was a reference to the language of 1 Tim. vi. 16. In reply to the question, "What are the things in your satchel?", he said "Books and letters of Paul, a just man." 

The dialogue between the Proconsul and the martyrs shows that the former entertained no prejudices against the Christians. He exhorts them to comply with the law, and when they decline he suggests that they take time to think on the matter. The martyrs were offered a delay of 30 days to reconsider their decision, which they all refused. They were then put to death by the sword.

The fame of the martyrs led to the building of a basilica in their honor at Carthage and their annual commemoration required that the brevity and obscurity of their Acta should be supplemented and explained to make them suitable for public recitation.

Veneration
Agobard, archbishop of Lyons (c. 779–840) stated that the relics of Speratus, and those of Cyprian, were translated by Charlemagne's orders from Carthage to Lyons.

The historical questions connected with these martyrs were addressed by bishop Joseph Barber Lightfoot in Epistles of Ignatius and Polycarp, 1885.

See also
 Libellus

Notes

References

Further reading
 Stokes, G.T., "Scillitan Martyrs", Dictionary of Christian Biography, (Henry Wace ed.), John Murray, London, 1911
 H. Musurillo, trans., "The Acts of the Scillitan Martyrs" in The Acts of the Christian Martyrs (Oxford: University Press, 1972).

External links
 
 The Passion of the Scillitan Martyrs at Early Christian Writings
 Parallel Latin and English texts of Act

Videography
Lost Legacy Reclaimed, Season 1: Episode 1. The Scillitan Martyrs (2019) - documentary. 

Groups of Christian martyrs of the Roman era
Numidian saints
Date of birth unknown
180 deaths
2nd-century Christian martyrs
Christian anarchism